Manjū Rock is an exposed rock lying midway between Tama Glacier and Tama Point on the coast of Queen Maud Land, Antarctica. It was mapped from surveys and air photos by the Japanese Antarctic Research Expedition, 1957–62, and named Manjū-iwa (bun-shaped rock).

References

Rock formations of Queen Maud Land
Prince Olav Coast